Gabriel Ogun (born 10 June 1946) is a Nigerian boxer. He competed in the men's light flyweight event at the 1968 Summer Olympics.

References

1946 births
Living people
Nigerian male boxers
Olympic boxers of Nigeria
Boxers at the 1968 Summer Olympics
Sportspeople from Lagos
Light-flyweight boxers